Tulcus amazonicus is a species of beetle in the family Cerambycidae. It was described by James Thomson in 1860. It is known from Ecuador and Brazil.

References

amazonicus
Beetles described in 1860